List of D6 System books is a listing of commercially released books from West End Games, its successors, and licensees for the D6 System role-playing game. This does not include various free downloads, fan-made works or forthcoming releases. Accessories such as card decks, screens and miniatures are also not listed. All books are print editions unless noted as otherwise.
 Ghostbusters: A Frightfully Cheerful Roleplaying Game (1986)
 Ghost Toasties w/GM Screen (1986)
 Hot Rods of the Gods (1986)
 Scared Stiffs (1987)
 Ghostbusters International (1989)
 ApoKERMIS Now! (1989)
 Ghostbusters II - The Adventure w/GM Screen (1989)
 Tobin's Spirit Guide (1989)
 Lurid Tales of Doom (1990)
 Pumpkin Patch Panic (1990)
 The Star Wars Roleplaying Game (1987)
 The Star Wars Sourcebook (1987)
 Campaign Pack (1988)
 Tatooine Manhunt (1988)
 Imperial Sourcebook (1988)
 Strike Force: Shantipole (1988)
 Battle for the Golden Sun (1988)
 Starfall (1989)
 Otherspace (1989)
 Otherspace II: Invasion
 Scavenger Hunt (1989)
 Riders of the Maelstrom (1989)
 Crisis on Cloud City (1989)
 The Far Orbit Project (1998)
 Black Ice
 The Game Chambers of Questal
 Domain of Evil (1991)
 The Isis Coordinates (1990)
 Death in the Undercity
 Rebel Alliance Sourcebook (1989)
 Graveyard of Alderaan (1989)
 Death Star Technical Companion (1991)
 Cracken's Rebel Field Guide
 Flashpoint! Brak Sector (1995)
 The Rules Companion
 Galaxy Guide 1: A New Hope
 Galaxy Guide 2: Yavin and Bespin
 Galaxy Guide 3: The Empire Strikes Back
 Galaxy Guide 4: Alien Races
 Galaxy Guide 5: The Return of the Jedi
 Galaxy Guide 6: Tramp Freighters
 Galaxy Guide 7: Mos Eisley
 Galaxy Guide 8: Scouts
 Galaxy Guide 9: Fragments from the Rim
 Galaxy Guide 10: Bounty Hunters
 Galaxy Guide 11: Criminal Organizations
 Galaxy Guide 12: Aliens - Enemies and Allies
 Fantastic Technology: Guns and Gear
 Planets of the Galaxy Volume 1
 Planets of the Galaxy Volume 2
 Planets of the Galaxy Volume 3
 Wanted by Cracken
 Dark Force Rising Sourcebook
 Heir to the Empire Sourceook
 The Last Command Sourcebook
 Thrawn Trilogy Sourcebook
 Dark Empire Sourcebook
 Movie Trilogy Sourcebook
 Creatures of the Galaxy
 Cracken's Rebel Operatives
 Han Solo and the Corporate Sector Sourcebook
 Heroes and Rogues
 Goroth - Slave of the Empire
 The Planets Collection
 Platt's Starport Guide
 Alliance Intelligence Report
 Hideouts and Strongholds
 Rules of Engagement: The Rebel SpecForce Handbook
 Fantastic Technology: Droids
 Shadows of the Empire Sourcebook
 Secrets of the Sisar Run
 Cracken's Threat Dossier
 Platt's Smugglers Guide
 Pirates and Privateers
 Stock Ships
 Wretched Hive of Scum and Villainy
 Black Sands of Socorro
 Fantastic Technology: Personal Gear
 Alien Encounters
 Lords of the Expanse
 The Player's Guide to Tapani
 The Darkstryder Campaign
 Darkstryder: Endgame
 Darkstryder: The Kathol Outback
 Darkstryder: The Kathol Rift
 Tales Of The Jedi Sourcebook
 Gamemaster's Guide
 Truce At Bakura Sourcebook
 Jedi Academy Trilogy Sourcebook
 Movie Trilogy Special Edition Sourcebook
 The Star Wars Roleplaying Game, 2nd Edition (1992)
 The Star Wars Roleplaying Game, 2nd Edition Revised & Expanded (1996)
 The D6 System: The Customizable Roleplaying Game (1996)
 Indiana Jones Adventures (1996)
 Men in Black (1997)
 The Director's Guide (1997)
 Aliens Recognition Guide #1 (1997)
 Introductory Adventure Game (1998)
 The Hercules & Xena Roleplaying Game1 (1998)
 DC Universe1 (1999)
 DC Universe Narrator's Screen (1999)
 Daily Planet Guide to Gotham City, The (2000)
 Daily Planet Guide to Metropolis, The (2000)
 Gotham City Sourcebook (2000)
 JLA Sourcebook (2000)
 Metropolis Sourcebook (2000)
 Department of Extranormal Operations Agent Manual, The (2001)
 Department of Extranormal Operations: Directive on Superpowers (2001)
 JSA Sourcebook (2001)
 Magic Handbook (2001)
 Metabarons (2001)
 Gamemaster Screen (2001)
 Guidebook #1 - Path of the Warrior (2002)
 Psibertroopers
 D6 Adventure (PDF only, 2003)
 D6 Adventure Rulebook (2004)
 Bloodshadows Worldbook (2004)
 Adventure Locations (2004)
 Adventure Creatures (2005)
 D6 Space Opera (PDF only, 2003)
 D6 Space Rulebook (2004)
 Space Ships (2004)
 Space Aliens 1 (2005)
 Fires of Amatsumara Worldbook (2005)
 D6 Fantasy Rulebook (2004)
 Fantasy: Locations (2004)
 Fantasy: Creatures (2005)
 Khepera Publishing
 Godsend Agenda D6
 Godsend Agenda: Mythos
 D6 Powers
 Godsend Agenda: U.S.E.R.'s Most Wanted
 Godsend Agenda: Godmaker
 West End Games
 Bill Coffin's Septimus2 (2009)

1uses Legend System (aka D6 Prime) variant
2uses OpenD6 -- the D6 System, released under OGL v1.0

 
D6 System
D6 System